The following is a list of the television networks and announcers who have broadcast college football's Citrus Bowl throughout the years.

ABC televised the game from 1987 to 2010, with NBC airing it in 1984–85 and the syndicated Mizlou Television Network doing so prior to 1984. In March 2010, ESPN announced extensions to their television contracts with the Capital One Bowl and the Outback Bowl, along with a new contract with the Gator Bowl. The contract for the now Citrus Bowl is through 2018. Under these new agreements, ESPN will broadcast all three games on either ABC, ESPN, or ESPN2.

Radio broadcast rights for the game are currently held by ESPN Radio. Sports USA Radio held the rights from 2003–2010.

Television

Radio

References

Citrus Bowl
Broadcasters
Citrus Bowl
Citrus Bowl
Citrus Bowl
Citrus Bowl